The Diocese of Kansas City–Saint Joseph is a Latin Church ecclesiastical territory or diocese of the Catholic Church in the state of Missouri in the United States.  The current bishop is James Vann Johnston, Jr. Diocese of Kansas City–Saint Joseph is a suffragan diocese in the ecclesiastical province of the metropolitan Archdiocese of Saint Louis. The see city for the diocese is Kansas City, Missouri.  The cathedral parish is Cathedral of the Immaculate Conception and its co-cathedral is the Cathedral of St. Joseph in St. Joseph, Missouri. The diocese encompasses the counties of Andrew, Atchison, Bates, Buchanan, Caldwell, Carroll, Cass, Clay, Clinton, Daviess, DeKalb, Gentry, Grundy, Harrison, Henry, Holt, Jackson, Johnson, Lafayette, Livingston, Mercer, Nodaway, Platte, Ray, St. Clair, Vernon and Worth in Missouri.

History
On September 10, 1880, Pope Leo XIII established the Diocese of Kansas City, with territories taken from the Archdiocese of St. Louis. Its first bishop was John Joseph Hogan.  On July 2, 1956, the diocese incorporated part of the territory of the Diocese of Saint Joseph, which had been established by Pope Pius IX on March 3, 1868.  On the same date in 1956 part of the Diocese of Kansas City's territory went to establish the Diocese of Jefferson City and the Diocese of Springfield-Cape Girardeau.  The diocese received its present name and boundaries at that time.

Bishops
Bishops affiliated with the Diocese of Saint Joseph, which is now united with the Diocese of Kansas City (Missouri), are listed in the Wikipedia article about the Diocese of Saint Joseph.

The lists of bishops and their years of service:

Bishops of Kansas City
 John Joseph Hogan (1880–1913)
 Thomas Francis Lillis (1913–1938)
 Edwin Vincent O'Hara (1939–1956), elevated to Archbishop (ad personam) in 1954

Bishops of Kansas City–Saint Joseph
 John Patrick Cody (1956–1961), appointed Coadjutor Archbishop and Archbishop of New Orleans  and later Archbishop of Chicago (elevated to Cardinal in 1967)
 Charles Herman Helmsing (1962–1977)
 John J. Sullivan (1977–1993)
 Raymond James Boland (1993–2005)
 Robert W. Finn (2005–2015)
 James Vann Johnston, Jr. (2015–present)
(Joseph Fred Naumann was apostolic administrator in 2015.)

Coadjutor Bishops
 John J. Glennon (1896–1903), did not succeed to this see; appointed Coadjutor Archbishop and later Archbishop of St. Louis (elevated to Cardinal in 1946)
 John P. Cody (1954–1956)
 Robert W. Finn (2004–2005)

Auxiliary Bishops
 Joseph M. Marling (1947–1956), appointed Bishop of Jefferson City
 Joseph Vincent Sullivan (1967–1974), appointed Bishop of Baton Rouge
 George Kinzie Fitzsimons (1975–1984), appointed Bishop of Salina

Other priests of this diocese who became bishops
 Michael Francis McAuliffe, appointed Bishop of Jefferson City in 1969
 William Wakefield Baum, appointed Bishop of Springfield-Cape Girardeau in 1970 and later Archbishop of Washington, Prefect of the Congregation for Catholic Education, and Major Penitentiary of the Apostolic Penitentiary (created a Cardinal in 1976)
 Joseph Hubert Hart, appointed Auxiliary Bishop (in 1976) and later Bishop of Cheyenne in 1978
 Lawrence James McNamara, appointed Bishop of Grand Island in 1978

Child abuse scandal
On September 6, 2012, Bishop Robert Finn was convicted on one misdemeanor count of failing to report suspected child abuse, based on his knowledge of the activities of a priest in his diocese, Rev. Shawn Ratigan, who in August 2012 pleaded guilty to five counts of possession and production of child pornography and was sentenced to 50 years in prison. In May 2010, the principal of the Catholic elementary school where Father Ratigan was working had sent a memo to the diocese raising alarm about the priest. The letter said that he had put a girl on his lap on a bus ride and encouraged children to reach into his pockets for candy, and that parents discovered girl's underwear in a planter outside his house. Finn said he did not read the letter until a year later. In December, 2010, a computer technician and a deacon informed the diocese of several "alarming" photos on Ratigan's laptop. Catholic canon law and Federal law, as well as the diocese's own policies, mandated that the diocese report any allegations of sexual abuse. Diocesan officials contacted a police officer and the diocesan attorney the next day, both of whom said that the images did not constitute child pornography and thus there was no crime to report either to a diocesan review board or to the police.

The next day, Ratigan was discovered unconscious in his closed garage, his motorcycle running, along with a suicide note apologizing to the children, their families and the church.  Finn sought psychiatric treatment for Ratigan and in February, 2011, imposed seven restrictions on Ratigan, including the instruction to "avoid all contact with children." In March, however, it was reported to Finn that Ratigan had been present at a six-year-old girl's birthday party, and in May, Finn disclosed the existence of the photographs to police. In October, 2011, both the diocese and Finn were indicted for failure to report suspected child abuse, a misdemeanor, which carries a maximum penalty of one-year imprisonment or a $1,000 fine, based on the six-month delay in reporting the existence of the photographs. After a brief bench trial, Finn was convicted on one count, acquitted on a second count, and sentenced to two years probation, and charges against the diocese were dropped. The Vatican announced the bishop's resignation April 21, 2015, specifying it was under the terms of the Code of Canon Law, which says, "A diocesan bishop who has become less able to fulfill his office because of ill health or some other grave cause is earnestly requested to present his resignation from office."

By 2019, the Diocese had paid a total of $20 million to 50 people who were sexually abused by Father Joseph Hart, Monsignor Thomas O'Brien and Father Thomas Reardon.

Conception Abbey 
In August 2019, Fr. Benedict Neenan, the Abbot of the Archdiocese's Conception Abbey, unveiled a list of 8 monks who were credibly accused of committing acts of sex abuse while serving in the Abbey, seven of whom are dead and one removed from ministry. Neenan also issued an "unconditional apology to all victims and their families affected by the evil of clergy sexual abuse."

Lake Viking 
By August 2019, former Diocese of Kansas City–Saint Joseph priest and future Diocese of Cheyenne Bishop Joseph Hart had more than a dozen sex abuse accusations against him from his time in not only the Diocese of Kansas City–Saint Joseph, but also the Diocese of Cheyenne as well. Hart had previously been transferred to the Diocese of Cheyenne in the 1970s after sex abuse allegations surfaced against him. On August 28, 2019, it was announced that a house owned by O'Brien on Lake Viking was a frequent place where Hart, who is under both civil and canonical investigations, and O'Brien would sexually abuse children. O'Brien's sister was also a co-owner and would assist in protecting them. Shortly before his death in 2013, O'Brien had agreed to pay a wrongful death settlement of more than $2 million to the family of one of his victims who committed suicide, and also had six pending sex abuse lawsuits at the time of his death as well.

2020 lawsuits 
In July 2020, two new lawsuits were filed in Jackson County Circuit Court against the Diocese of Kansas City involving alleged rape by two priests in 2018. The lawsuit alleges that Diocese covered up the abuse, which then allowed the two priests to gain access to and sexually abuse other vulnerable individuals as well. One of the two accused priests, now dead, is on the diocese's list of those found to have been credibly accused of sexual abuse of a minor. The other, who was not on the accused list, was revealed to have been placed on leave from his duties in 2018.

Educational institutions

High schools

Closed high schools

See also

 Catholic Church by country
 Catholic Church in the United States
 Ecclesiastical Province of Saint Louis
 Global organisation of the Catholic Church
 List of Roman Catholic archdioceses (by country and continent)
 List of Roman Catholic dioceses (alphabetical) (including archdioceses)
 List of Roman Catholic dioceses (structured view) (including archdioceses)
 List of the Catholic dioceses of the United States

References
Specific citations:

External links
 Roman Catholic Diocese of Kansas City–Saint Joseph Official Site

 
Kansas City-Saint Joseph
Kansas City
Kansas City-Saint Joseph
Kansas City-Saint Joseph
Christianity in Missouri
1880 establishments in Missouri
Religion in Kansas City, Missouri